Abrotanella papuana is a member of the daisy family and is endemic species to New Guinea.

References

papuana
Flora of New Guinea